Candelariella corallizoides is a species of squamulose (scaley), saxicolous (rock-dwelling) lichen in the family Candelariaceae. Found in Mexico, it was formally described as a new species in 2007 by Swedish lichenologist Martin Westberg. Here, in open oak woodland with shrubs, it was found growing on siliceous rock. The lichen is known to occur in several localities in Baja California. The specific epithet corallizoides refers to the coralloid (resembling coral) squamules of the thallus.

References

corallizoides
Lichen species
Lichens described in 2007
Lichens of Mexico